4x Mixed Relay Triathlon was part of the triathlon at the 2010 Summer Youth Olympics programme. It was held on 19 August 2010 at East Coast Park. The teams were made based on the results of the boys' and girls' triathlon event held of August 15–16, 2010. Each team had two boys and two girls and were split by continent. A total of 15 teams raced in the event.

Medalists

Results 
The race began at approximately 9:00 a.m. (UTC+8) on 19 August at East Coast Park.

Note: No one is allotted the number 13.

References 

Triathlon at the 2010 Summer Youth Olympics
Triathlon 2010